The Dismal Swamp is a marshy area in
Middlesex County in
central New Jersey.  The marshes border the towns of Edison,
South Plainfield, and Metuchen.

The Dismal Swamp is a wetland ecosystem located in an
urban environment.
Metuchen with the remaining portion in Edison and South Plainfield. The swamp
contains a number of wildlife species, including the endangered
loggerhead shrike. There are an estimated 165 different species of birds
in the swamp.

History
The swamp's geology is part of the Passaic Formation and consists of sedimentary rock composed of red-brown shale.

Relics found in the swamp, believed to be from prehistoric times, include stone axes, spear heads, and arrow points indicating that the swamp was
inhabited by early man.

A vineyard was planted in the southern section of the swamp during the 1700s with subsequent agriculture development during the 1800s.

In the early 1900s a Russian exile settlement, New Petrograd, was established near the swamp near the Metuchen border.

It is believed that the name of the swamp comes from Dismal Brook, a stream that once flowed through the area.

The Triple C Ranch, located within Dismal Swamp, is headquarters to the Edison Wetlands Association. Located in the middle of the Swamp, and
County.

The Middlesex Greenway a rail-trail provides public access to some sections of the swamp.

References

Swamps of New Jersey
Protected areas of Middlesex County, New Jersey
Landforms of Middlesex County, New Jersey
Edison, New Jersey